Sébastien Lareau and Daniel Nestor were the defending champions, but Nestor did not compete this year. Lareau teamed up with Michael Hill and lost in first round to David Adams and John-Laffnie de Jager.

Mark Woodforde and Todd Woodbridge won the title by defeating Lleyton Hewitt and Sandon Stolle 7–5, 6–4 in the final. It was the 61st title for both players in their respective careers. It was also the 2nd title for the pair during the season, after their win in Adelaide.

Seeds

Draw

Draw

References
 Main Draw

Adidas International
Adidas